"Burning" is a short story by Orson Scott Card.  It only appears in his short story collection Capitol.

Plot summary
Captain Homer Worthing and a fleet of twenty ship all piloted by telepaths are orbiting a settled star system.  They are on the run from the imperial fleet and trying to leave settled space.  When they request permission to take on supplies so that they can leave, the planetary authorities refuse.  By the time the imperial fleet arrives they are nearly out of fuel and unable to fight the fleet or force their way down to the planets except by destroying one of them with a fusion bomb.  Captain Homer refuses to consider this but when some of the ships run out of fuel he is removed from command and a threat is made to blow up one of the planets.  No one believes they will do it and the imperial fleet attacks.  After a second battle with the fleet one of the captains launches bombs at the planets but they are intercepted by Captain Homer.  When a final volley of missiles is fired at Captain Homer’s ship he launches fusion bombs at all three planets in anger.  Captain Homer immediately regrets his decision, but his ship is destroyed by missiles just as he is about to abort the bombs. When the fleet gets back to Capitol the commanders get medals and almost a hundred thousand telepaths are murdered.

Connection to the Worthing Saga
This story uses several plot elements also used in The Worthing Saga, such as the sleeping drug Somec and the taping of memories.  It takes place on the planet Capitol shortly after the events in the story "Breaking the Game".  The story of Homer Worthing's destruction of a star system also appears in a much shorter form as a part of chapter 3 in Card's novel The Worthing Chronicle.

See also

List of works by Orson Scott Card
Orson Scott Card

External links
 The official Orson Scott Card website

1978 short stories
Short stories by Orson Scott Card